The , formerly the Asakawa Experiment Forest and sometimes also known as the Tama Botanical Park, is an arboretum located at the foot of Mount Takao, 1833-81 Todori, Hachiōji, Tokyo, Japan. It is open daily except Mondays; an admission fee is charged.

The site was previously a battlefield where Hojo Ujiteru fought Takeda Shingen, then placed under custody of the Tokugawa shogunate. In 1921 it became an experimental station under the custody of the Forestry Management Division of the Ministry of Imperial Household. Today it is a branch laboratory of the Forestry and Forest Products Research Institute.

The garden includes 13 hectares of natural forest which consists mainly of Abies firma and Pinus densiflora, and broad-leaf evergreens such as Quercus glauca and Castanopsis cuspidata var. sieboldii. It also contains an arboretum with about 1,000 kinds of domestic and foreign trees, including 2,000 cherry trees representing 250 cherry varieties.

See also 
 List of botanical gardens in Japan

References 
 Tama Forest Science Garden (Japanese)
 Hachioji City official site
 Forest Succession in the Tama Forest Science Garden
 Toyoda Takeshi and Tanimoto Takeo, "Forest Succession in the Tama Forest Science Garden (the Asakawa Experiment Forest), Hachioji, Central Japan", Bulletin of the Forestry and Forest Products Research Institute, no. 377, 2000, pages 1-60. ISSN 0916-4405.

Arboreta in Japan
Botanical gardens in Japan
Gardens in Tokyo
Hachiōji, Tokyo